George Morrow (August 15, 1925 – May 26, 1992) was a jazz bassist.

Although most closely associated with Max Roach and Clifford Brown, Morrow also appears on recordings by Sonny Rollins and Sonny Stitt.

Morrow was born in Pasadena, California.

After leaving the military, George played with Charlie Parker, Sonny Criss, Teddy Edwards, Hampton Hawes and other musicians who were in L.A. George then spent five years in San Francisco (1948–53), often appearing at the Bop City jazz club and working with Dexter Gordon, Wardell Gray, Billie Holiday and Sonny Clark, among others.

According to Roach, Morrow had been "free-lancing around San Francisco clubs" when they hired him to play with them after having rejecting two other bassists. He appeared on all of the studio albums made by the Clifford Brown-Max Roach Quintet. After the band dissolved due to the deaths of Brown and Richie Powell in a car accident, Morrow continued recording with Max Roach's band. He also worked with Anita O'Day in the 1970s before joining the Disney World house band in 1976.

He died in Orlando, Florida. He never led his own recording date.

Discography 
With Curtis Amy
Way Down (Pacific Jazz, 1962)
With Earl Anderza
Outa Sight (Pacific Jazz, 1962)
With Clifford Brown and Max Roach
 Jam Session (EmArcy, 1954) - with Maynard Ferguson and Clark Terry
 Brown and Roach Incorporated (EmArcy, 1954) 
 Daahoud (Mainstream, 1954 [1973]) 
 Clifford Brown & Max Roach (Emarcy, 1954–55) 
 Study in Brown (EmArcy, 1955)
 Clifford Brown and Max Roach at Basin Street (EmArcy, 1956) 
With Anita O'Day
Cool Heat (Verve, 1959)
With Max Roach
 Max Roach + 4 (EmArcy, 1956)
 Jazz in ¾ Time (EmArcy, 1956–57)
 The Max Roach 4 Plays Charlie Parker (Emarcy, 1958)
 MAX (Argo, 1958)
With Sonny Rollins
 Rollins Plays for Bird (Prestige, 1956) 
 Work Time (Prestige, 1956)
 Sonny Rollins Plus 4 (Riverside, 1956)
 Tour de Force (Prestige, 1956)
 Sonny Boy (Prestige, 1956 [1961])
With Sonny Stitt
 The Hard Swing (Verve, 1959)
 Sonny Stitt Swings the Most (Verve, 1959)

References 

1925 births
1992 deaths
American jazz double-bassists
Male double-bassists
20th-century American musicians
20th-century double-bassists
20th-century American male musicians
American male jazz musicians